Zabrus asiaticus is a species of ground beetle in the Pelor subgenus. It was described by Francis de Laporte de Castelnau in 1834 and is found in Bulgaria, Greece, Romania, the North Aegean  islands, European part of Turkey and the Near East.

References

Beetles described in 1834
Beetles of Asia
Beetles of Europe
Zabrus